Lars Tobisson (born 19 November 1938) is a Swedish former Moderate politician.

Tobisson was a Member of Parliament in Sweden from 1979 to 2001 also serving as leader of the Finance Committee. From 1974 to 1981, he was Party Secretary within the Moderate Party and from 1981 to 1999 he served as Deputy Party Leader. When Moderate Party was in Government between 1991 and 1994 he was also leader of the Moderate Party in the Riksdag. Tobisson has a background as a military in the Swedish Army, earning the degree of Captain in 1972.

References

Living people
1938 births
People from Gothenburg
Members of the Riksdag from the Moderate Party
Swedish Army officers